Prošće is a hamlet in Pljevlja Municipality, in northern Montenegro.

Demographics
According to the 2003 census, the village had a population of 2 people.

References

Populated places in Pljevlja Municipality